Nils Magnus Roosmann (born Bjurström; 11 June 1963 in Söder in Stockholm (grew up in Lessebo)) is a Swedish actor.

Roosmann studied at the Swedish National Academy of Mime and Acting and after that he has been engaged at Wasa Theatre in Vaasa, Finland, Malmö Opera and Music Theatre, Uppsala City Theatre and the Royal Dramatic Theatre. In film he has played well known roles.

Roosmann has also read audiobooks.

Filmography

Audiobooks
2008 - The Hard Way
2007 - One Shot
2005 - The Lincoln Lawyer

References

External links 

Swedish male actors
1963 births
Living people
Audiobook narrators